Daniel Skaaning (born 22 June 1993) is a former Danish freestyle swimmer. He competed in the 4 × 200 metre freestyle relay event at the 2012 Summer Olympics.
He is a teacher in a school in Taastrup.

References

1993 births
Living people
Danish male freestyle swimmers
Olympic swimmers of Denmark
Swimmers at the 2012 Summer Olympics
Swimmers at the 2016 Summer Olympics
Place of birth missing (living people)